The Glasgow and Ship Bank was created in 1836 from the merger of the Ship Bank and the Glasgow Banking Company.

The  Glasgow and Ship Bank was formed as a private bank. In 1843, the partners accepted an offer from the Union Bank of Scotland to buy the business.

References

1836 establishments in Scotland
1843 disestablishments in Scotland
Defunct banks of Scotland
Banks established in 1836
Banks disestablished in 1843